Burcher is a small rural village situated in central New South Wales, Australia, in Lachlan Shire. As of 2006, Burcher had a population of 185. Its main attractions include Lake Cowal, known for its diverse birdlife; and the Lake Cowal Gold Mine, an open cut mine situated south-east of Burcher.

The community of Burcher has two churches, a public school, a local hotel, and a corner store. Sporting facilities include a nine-hole golf course, a cricket field, and tennis courts. The school has closed and the school property is now in private ownership .

References

External links 

Burcher Railway Station

Gallery

Towns in New South Wales
Towns in the Central West (New South Wales)
Lachlan Shire